Epimolis flavonotata is a moth of the family Erebidae. It was described by Walter Rothschild in 1909. It is found in French Guiana, the Amazon region and Venezuela.

References

Phaegopterina
Moths described in 1909